All Assam Students' Union or AASU is a Assamese nationalist students' organisation in Assam, India. It is best known for leading the six-year Assam Movement against Bengalis of both Indian and Bangladeshi origin living in Assam. The leadership, after the historic Assam Accord of 1985,

History
In 1940, a student union named Asom Chattra Sanmilan (Assam Students' Association) divided into the All Assam Student Federation and the All Assam Students' Congress. A decade later the two recombined as the All Assam Students' Association, which was later renamed All Assam Students' Union in January 1967. In August 1967, the Union "established itself as a formal organisation and adopted its Constitution".

Assam agitation
AASU began intensifying the agitational programme against inclusion of illegal immigrants in the voter list and started facilitating the participation of all section of people . As part of the preparations for the Lok Sabha election, the Chief Electoral Officer [CEC] had asked Assam to include all names from the earlier voter list in the draft electoral roll . AASU warned the political parties not to take part in the election unless the electoral rolls were revised and the names of illegal immigrants removed. 

AASU formed the All Assam Gana Sangram Parishad in August 1979 consisting of AASU, Assam Sahitya Sabha, Purbanchaliya Lok Parishad. The Jatiyatabadi Dal, Asom Yubak Samaj and Young Lawyers Forum also joined the Gana Parisha later on. AASU started observing massive satyagraha on the lines of India freedom struggle. Thousands courted arrest daily . The movement continued for six years. It became violent at some point of time, massive in almost all the times during the six years. The most important part of the movement was that the movement got massive mass support from almost all segments of the society except from the ruling government and a few others who would benefit from illegal Bangladeshis' votes. AASU declared different times that the agitation was against all illegal foreigners irrespective of religion or community. AASU continuously had been informing the central government with direct communication to the Prime Minister that the influx from Bangladesh had posed serious threat to the existence of the indigenous people of the state of Assam and the entire North Eastern region and changed the demography of the region.

Assam Accord
Finally the central government signed the historic Assam Accord in 1985 to resolve the matter. The agitation ended and AGP won the election to the state Legislative Assembly and its leader became the chief minister of the state.

Under the Assam Accord, a person who came to Assam from East Pakistan after 1951 and before 1971 was given citizenship. The Assam Accord stated in clause 6 that while giving citizenship to immigrants, constitutional protection will be given to original citizens of Assam. The Illegal Migrants (Determination by Tribunal) Act, 1983 (IMDT Act) was enacted by the Parliament of India in 1983 . This Act was struck down by the Supreme Court of India in 2005.

Known as the IMDT Act (1983) it described the procedures to detect illegal immigrants (from Bangladesh) and expel them from Assam. The Act was pushed through mainly on the grounds that it provided special protections against undue harassment to the "minorities" that were affected by the Assam Agitation.  It was applicable to state of Assam only whereas in other states, detection of foreigners is done under The Foreigners Act, 1946.

Citizenship Amendment Bill 
The students' union stated that it opposes the Citizenship (Amendment) Bill stating that it is unconstitutional.

The Lok Sabha on 9th Dec 2019 passed the bill for Citizenship (Amendment) 2019 with 311 votes in favour and 80 against. The Rajya Sabha on 11th Dec 2019 passed the Citizenship (Amendment) Bill, 2019, with 125 votes in favour and 99 against.

Following the passage of the bill and as a result of its stir against it, the students' union (AASU) and Asom Jatiyatabadi Yuba Chatra Parishad (AJYCP) came together to launch a new regional political party, Assam Jaitya Parishad in September 2020 to contest the 2021 Assam Legislative Assembly election.

See also
Asom Sena
All Assam Gorkha Student Union
Assamese Language Movement
Assam Movement
Citizenship Amendment Act

References

External links

Samujjal Bhattacharya to continue as AASU chief adviser  www.aasu.co.in.

1967 establishments in Assam
Asom Gana Parishad
Organisations based in Assam
Student organizations established in 1967
Students' unions in India
Volunteer organisations in India